The Mendlesham transmitting station is a broadcasting and telecommunications facility, situated close to the village of Mendlesham, near the town of Stowmarket, in Suffolk, United Kingdom. It is owned and operated by Arqiva.

Constructed in 1959, it came into service on 27 October of that year. It was at the time the highest television mast to be constructed in Europe and the first of six of the same height subsequently used at other Independent Television Authority stations. It was fabricated in Hereford from zinc-galvanised steel, and was erected by British Insulated Callender's Construction Co. (BICC), now known as Balfour Beatty.

It was originally commissioned to bring ITV signals (provided by Anglia Television) to East Anglia, including Norfolk, Suffolk and parts of Essex and Cambridgeshire on 405-line VHF, using Channel 11 (Band III).

When UHF television came to East Anglia, main transmitters were commissioned at Tacolneston, near Norwich and Sudbury, near Colchester. Mendlesham was not required in the UHF plan, so when 405 line television was discontinued in the UK in 1985, the mast ceased to be used for any broadcast transmissions for over a decade.

However, in 1997, the site was chosen to be a main transmitter for new regional commercial radio station Vibe FM (renamed Kiss 105-108 in 2006), on 106.4 MHz VHF FM at a power of 20 kW. Vibe FM launched November 1997.  Later in December 2001, national digital radio multiplex Digital One also added its antennas to the mast. The BBC National DAB Multiplex was added on 13 July 2010.

Channels listed by frequency

Analogue radio (VHF FM)

Digital radio (DAB)

Analogue television
VHF analogue television was transmitted from Mendlesham from its launch in 1959 until the nationwide shutdown of VHF signals in 1985.

See also
List of masts
List of tallest buildings and structures in Great Britain
List of radio stations in the United Kingdom

References

External links
 15 minute film of the construction of Mendlesham mast
 Mendlesham entry at The Transmission Gallery
Mast location on MultiMap.com
 http://skyscraperpage.com/diagrams/?b61326
Mendlesham Transmitter at thebigtower.com
Confirmation of addition of BBC DAB Multiplex, July 2010

Radio masts and towers in Europe
Transmitter sites in England